Jam of the Year may refer to:

Jam of the Year Rebel Army Radio
"Jam of the Year", Prince song from Emancipation (Prince album) 
Jam of the Year Tour, Prince